Le Bonheur ("Happiness") is a 1965 French drama film directed by Agnès Varda. The film is associated with the French New Wave and won two awards at the 15th Berlin International Film Festival, including the Jury Grand Prix.

Plot
François, a handsome young joiner working for his uncle, lives a comfortable and happy life married to his pretty wife Thérèse, a dressmaker, with whom he has two delightful children, Pierrot and Gisou. The family love outings to the woods outside of town. Although finding abundant happiness in his life and indisputably loving his wife and children, François falls for Émilie, an attractive single woman working in the post office, who has a flat of her own and looks very like Thérèse. 

Picnicking in the woods one weekend, Thérèse asks François why he seems so particularly happy of late. He explains that all his existing happiness with her and the children is not changed in any way but has been increased by the new happiness he has found with Émilie.  Initially, she is upset at the revelation, but then accepts it, saying her world is his happiness. Putting the children to sleep under a tree, Thérèse encourages François to make love to her. He falls asleep afterwards and, waking up, finds Thérèse gone. Searching desperately, he finds her body that anglers have retrieved from the lake.

After a spell in the country, where relatives are looking after the children, François returns to work and looks up Émilie. Soon she is living in his house, looking after him and the children. The family are all very happy together and love to go on outings to the woods outside of town. He has once again found abundant happiness in his life, indisputably loving his new wife and children.

Cast
 Jean-Claude Drouot as François
 Claire Drouot as Thérèse
 Olivier Drouot as Pierrot 
 Sandrine Drouot as Gisou
 Marie-France Boyer as Émilie Savignac
 Marcelle Faure-Bertin
 Manon Lanclos
 Sylvia Saurel
 Marc Eyraud
 Christian Riehl
 Paul Vecchiali as Paul

François' wife and children are played by Jean-Claude Drouot's real-life family in their only film appearances.

Reception
In a 2019 tribute to Agnès Varda, Sheila Heti, AS Hamrah, and Jenny Chamarette included Le Bonheur among their favourite of Varda's films, with Charmarette claiming it as her favourite and describing it as "like nothing else: a horror movie wrapped up in sunflowers, an excoriating feminist diatribe strummed to the tune of a love ballad. It’s one of the most terrifying films I’ve ever seen." Hamrah called Le Bonheur "Varda’s most shocking movie," adding "it’s deeply subversive and works like a horror film...How many films are truly shocking the way Le Bonheur is? I don’t think there are any others." While Heti stated "I don’t have a favourite, but the one I think about most often is probably Le Bonheur because it had such a devastating ending. It is perhaps the most straightforward in terms of story-telling, yet truly radical – emotionally radical, come the end...It’s impossible to stop thinking about this ending and what it says about love, life, chaos, and fate."

References

External links
 
 
 
 Le bonheur: Splendor in the Grass an essay by Amy Taubin at the Criterion Collection

1965 films
1965 drama films
French drama films
1960s French-language films
Films directed by Agnès Varda
Louis Delluc Prize winners
Silver Bear Grand Jury Prize winners
1960s French films